Fedlimid Rechtmar ("the lawful, legitimate" or "the passionate, furious") or Rechtaid ("the judge, lawgiver"), son of Tuathal Techtmar, was, according to medieval Irish legend and historical tradition, a High King of Ireland. His mother was Báine, daughter of Scál. He took power after killing his predecessor, and his father's killer, Mal mac Rochride. 

The chronology of Geoffrey Keating's Foras Feasa ar Éirinn dates his reign to 104–113, that of the Annals of the Four Masters to 110–119. The Lebor Gabála Érenn synchronises his reign with that of the Roman emperor Marcus Aurelius (161–180). 
He ruled for nine or ten years before dying in his bed, and was succeeded by Cathair Mór. One of his sons, Conn Cétchathach, would succeed Cathair. Two other sons, Fiacha Suighe, ancestor of the Dal Fiachrach Suighe, and Eochaid Finn, are named in medieval sources. 

He is said to have instituted the principle of an eye for an eye into Irish law, after which the behaviour of the Irish improved. 

The completion of the road construction around Tara is attributed to him.

Family tree

References

Legendary High Kings of Ireland